Glen Park may refer to:
Glen Park, Mauritius, a suburb of Vacoas-Phoenix, Mauritius
Glen Park, San Francisco, a neighborhood in San Francisco, California
Glen Park Station, a BART station servicing Glen Park, San Francisco
Glen Park, Toronto, a neighborhood in Toronto, Ontario
Glen Park, New York, a village in New York
Glen Park, Williamsville, a park in Williamsville, New York
Glen Park (Gary), a neighborhood in Gary, Indiana
Glen Park (Coquitlam), a park in Coquitlam, British Columbia
A district in the fictional city of Los Santos (Grand Theft Auto) from the game Grand Theft Auto: San Andreas